The finswimming competition at the 2022 World Games took place on 8 and 9 July 2022, in Birmingham in United States, at the Birmingham CrossPlex. Originally scheduled to take place in July 2021, the Games were rescheduled for July 2022 as a result of the 2020 Summer Olympics postponement due to the COVID-19 pandemic.

Qualification

Medal table

Medalists

Men

Women

References

External links
 The World Games 2022
 World Underwater Federation
 Results book

 
2022 World Games